Lucius Desha Bunton III (December 1, 1924 – January 17, 2001) was a United States district judge of the United States District Court for the Western District of Texas.

Education and career

Born in Del Rio, Texas, Bunton was a private in the United States Army, 76th Infantry Division, during World War II, from 1943 to 1946. He received a Bachelor of Arts degree from the University of Texas at Austin in 1947 and a Juris Doctor from the University of Texas School of Law in 1950. He was in private practice in Uvalde, Texas from 1950 to 1951, and in Marfa, Texas from 1951 to 1954. He was the district attorney of the 83rd Judicial District of Texas from 1954 to 1960, returning to private practice in Odessa, Texas from 1960 to 1979.

Federal judicial service

On October 11, 1979, Bunton was nominated by President Jimmy Carter to a seat on the United States District Court for the Western District of Texas vacated by Judge John H. Wood Jr. Bunton was confirmed by the United States Senate on November 26, 1979, and received his commission on November 27, 1979. He served as Chief Judge from 1987 to 1992, assuming senior status on December 1, 1992. Bunton took inactive senior status in May 2000 for health reasons due to a diagnosis of bladder cancer. He died  of a heart attack on January 17, 2001, in Austin.

References

Sources
 

1924 births
2001 deaths
Judges of the United States District Court for the Western District of Texas
United States district court judges appointed by Jimmy Carter
20th-century American judges
United States Army personnel of World War II
University of Texas alumni
University of Texas School of Law alumni
County district attorneys in Texas
People from Del Rio, Texas
People from Odessa, Texas